The CMLL International Gran Prix (1995) was a lucha libre, or professional wrestling, tournament produced and scripted by the Mexican professional wrestling promotion Consejo Mundial de Lucha Libre (CMLL; "World Wrestling Council" in Spanish) which took place on July 7, 1995  in Arena México, Mexico City, Mexico, CMLL's main venue. The 1995 International Gran Prix was the second time CMLL has held an International Gran Prix tournament since 1994. All International Gran Prix tournaments have been a one-night tournament, always as part of CMLL's Friday night CMLL Super Viernes shows.
The second ever International Gran Prix featured a one night, 16-man single elimination tournament consisting of Mexican natives and foreign-born wrestlers, some of which worked for CMLL on a regular basis (such as The Headhunters and El Boriqua) and others who were invited specially for the tournament (such as Johnny Gunn). The final match saw IWA Puerto Rico representative, Headhunter A defeat Canadian CMLL representative Vampiro Canadiense to win the International Gran Prix.

Production

Background
In 1994 the Mexican  professional wrestling promotion Consejo Mundial de Lucha Libre (CMLL) organized their first ever International Gran Prix tournament. The first tournament followed the standard "single elimination" format and featured sixteen wrestlers in total, eight representing Mexico and eight "international" wrestlers. In the end Mexican Rayo de Jalisco Jr. defeated King Haku in the finals to win the tournament. In 1995 CMLL brought the tournament back, creating an annual tournament.

Storylines
The CMLL Gran Prix show  featured fifteen professional wrestling matches scripted by CMLL with some wrestlers involved in scripted feuds. The wrestlers portray either heels (referred to as rudos in Mexico, those that play the part of the "bad guys") or faces (técnicos in Mexico, the "good guy" characters) as they perform.

Tournament

Tournament overview

Tournament brackets

Tournament show

References

1995 in professional wrestling
CMLL International Gran Prix